Uhthoff is a surname. Notable people with the surname include:

Ina D. D. Uhthoff (1889–1971), Scottish-Canadian painter
Wilhelm Uhthoff (1853–1927), German ophthalmologist

See also 
Uhthoff's phenomenon, is the worsening of neurologic symptoms in multiple sclerosis (MS) and other neurological, demyelinating conditions